The 2017–18 season of the Scottish Basketball Championship Women, the national women's basketball league of Scotland.

Format
In Premier Division, each team plays each other Premier Division team twice, once home once away, and each Division 1 team once, home or away, for a total of 15 games. 
In Division 1, each team plays each other Division 1 team twice, once home once away, and each Premier Division team once, home or away, for a total of 14 games.

Results

Premier Division

Division 1

Playoffs
Quarter-finals 

Semi-finals

Final

References

basketball
basketball